Carpilis is a genus of dirt-colored seed bugs in the family Rhyparochromidae. There are at least three described species in Carpilis.

Species
These three species belong to the genus Carpilis:
 Carpilis barberi Blatchley, 1924
 Carpilis consimilis Barber, 1949
 Carpilis ferruginea Stal, 1874

References

Rhyparochromidae
Articles created by Qbugbot